David Robbins (born September 10, 1942) is a retired American basketball coach.  Robbins is best known for coaching at NCAA Division II power Virginia Union University, where he won 713 games and three NCAA Division II men's basketball tournament titles.  Out of all NCAA coaches who have won more than 700 wins, Robbins is the second winningest coach with a winning percentage of 0.786 (713 wins, 194 losses).  He is second only to Adolph Rupp who had a winning percentage of 0.822.  Jerry Tarkanian, Dean Smith, Steve Moore, Roy Williams, Bill Self, Mike Krzyzewski, John Calipari, and Bo Ryan make up the remaining top ten.  Seven out of 10 of those coaches have been inducted into the Naismith Memorial Basketball Hall of Fame.  Robbins, Moore, and Ryan have not.

Robbins announced his retirement on April 15, 2008.  He is a member of the National Collegiate Basketball Hall of Fame, inducted in 2012.

Early life
Robbins grew up in Gastonia, North Carolina and played football, basketball, and ran track at Ashley High School. He was recruited to play basketball at Catawba College, but also played football and ran track.  Robbins coached at Thomas Jefferson High School in Richmond, Virginia where he led his 1975 team to the AAA State Championship prior to moving to Virginia Union University in 1978.

College coaching career
Robbins began coaching the Virginia Union Panthers in 1978, becoming the first white head coach in the history of the Central Intercollegiate Athletic Association (CIAA), a conference consisting of Historically black colleges and universities.  His hiring was highly controversial as many saw the hiring of a white coach as taking away opportunities from African-American candidates.

During his 30-year career, Robbins led his teams to a record of 713-194 and three NCAA Division II National Championships in 1980, 1992 and 2005.  His teams won 14 CIAA championships and garnered 21 NCAA tournament appearances.  During his time at VUU, Robbins produced four Division II players of the year, eight Consensus first team All-Americans, and five NBA players: Ben Wallace, Charles Oakley, Terry Davis, AJ English, and Jamie Waller.

Robbins officially retired on April 15, 2008, turning the program over to long-time assistant Willard Coker.

Legacy
Robbins is a member of the Catawba College, Virginia Union University, CIAA, Thomas Jefferson High School, and Gaston County (NC) Halls of Fame.  In 2010, Robbins was inducted into the Virginia Sports Hall of Fame and Museum.  In 2012, Robbins was elected to the National Collegiate Basketball Hall of Fame. In 2017, Robbins was inducted into the Small College Basketball Hall of Fame.  Most recently in April 2022, Robbins was inducted into the North Carolina Sports Hall of Fame.

See also
 List of college men's basketball coaches with 600 wins

References

1942 births
Living people
American men's basketball coaches
American men's basketball players
Basketball coaches from North Carolina
Basketball players from North Carolina
Catawba Indians football players
Catawba Indians men's basketball players
College men's basketball head coaches in the United States
College men's track and field athletes in the United States
High school basketball coaches in the United States
National Collegiate Basketball Hall of Fame inductees
People from Gastonia, North Carolina
Players of American football from North Carolina
Track and field athletes from North Carolina
Virginia Union Panthers men's basketball coaches